Fred G. Heyman was an American football player and coach. He served as the head football coach at Bethany College in Bethany, West Virginia in 1916.

He played college football at Washington & Jefferson College.

References

Year of birth missing
Year of death missing
American football ends
Massillon Tigers players
Washington & Jefferson Presidents football players
Bethany Bison football coaches
Bethany Bison baseball coaches